Lettin' Go may refer to:

 Lettin' Go (song), a song byJanelle Monáe
 Lettin' Go (album), an album by Son Seals